Anthony Barrile is an actor, musician, writer, and native New Yorker of Italian descent who has starred in many film and stage productions. He is well known to New York City audiences for his memorable performance as 'Cousin Kevin', the twisted lout in the original Broadway production of the Tony Award winning 'The Who's Tommy', and can be heard on its original cast recording. He also appeared in the acclaimed Off-Broadway production of "End of the World Party", among his other New York stage credits.

He is well known to cinema audiences for his role as 'Vinnie' in the 1985 horror film Friday the 13th: A New Beginning, and as 'Vincent 'Alphabet' Languilli', in the 1987 Vietnam War movie Hamburger Hill, as well as his favorite film appearance - 'Warren' in Kiss Me, Guido.

Mr. Barrile has made numerous guest appearances on television, including turns on Miami Vice, Law & Order, and Falcone.

He is currently continuing work on a screenplay about life, love and theatre, with co-screenwriter Geoffrey Nauffts. That work has been presented in several readings in both New York and Los Angeles, to wide acclaim.  It is to be produced by Red Hour Films, in association with Ted Hope's This is That Productions (Eternal Sunshine of the Spotless Mind, In the Bedroom, 21 Grams)

Appeared in Paula Abdul's music video of "Rush Rush".

He is originally from Brooklyn, New York and is the nephew of Leo Barrile.

He is close friends with Ben Stiller and Bobby Cannavale.

Filmography

External links

American male film actors
American male stage actors
American male television actors
Year of birth missing (living people)
Living people
Place of birth missing (living people)